Si Samran is a sub-district (tambon) in Phon Charoen District, in Bueng Kan Province, northeastern Thailand. As of 2010, it had a population of 4,506 people, with jurisdiction over seven villages.

References

Tambon of Bueng Kan province
Populated places in Bueng Kan province
Phon Charoen District